Park Place is a 56-floor mixed-use tower on Sheikh Zayed Road in Dubai, United Arab Emirates. The tower has a total structural height of 234.1 m (768 ft), making it the 68th-tallest building in Dubai as of 2022. Construction of Park Place was completed in 2007.

See also 
 List of tallest buildings in Dubai
 List of tallest buildings in the United Arab Emirates

References 

Bin Drai Enterprises

External links 
Emporis
Skyscraperpage

Residential skyscrapers in Dubai
Buildings and structures completed in 2007
Skyscraper office buildings in Dubai

https://www.bin-drai.com/property/park-place/